Le Lyonnais, or the Lyonnais, was an express train that linked Paris and Lyon in France.  Introduced in 1968, it was operated by the Société Nationale des Chemins de fer français (SNCF).  The train is named after the geographical area known as the Lyonnais, a historical (former) French province, whose name came from the city of Lyon.

Initially, Le Lyonnais was a Rapide.  From 1969 to 1976, it was a first-class-only Trans Europ Express (TEE).  It was then downgraded back to a Rapide until 1981, when it was replaced by a TGV.

Route
Le Lyonnaiss route was the first  of the Paris–Marseille railway.  The train had the following stops:

 Paris-Gare de Lyon – Dijon-Ville – Lyon-Perrache

Formation (consist)
Initially, Le Lyonnais was usually hauled by one of SNCF's four-axle 1.5 kV DC, Class BB 9200 electric locomotives.  In the 1970s, this class was replaced by the newer six-axle Class CC 6500.

When Le Lyonnais became a TEE in 1969, its formation of rolling stock was a rake of SNCF Mistral 56-type , being a Ds, six A8, one A5ru and a Compagnie Internationale des Wagons-Lits (CIWL) pullman car.

In 1971, the train's rolling stock was upgraded to Mistral 69-type DEV Inoxes, with the formation being an A4Dtux, four A8u, two A8tu, one A3rtu and a Vru. 

Throughout Le Lyonnaiss existence, its dining car was staffed by the CIWL.

See also

 History of rail transport in France
 List of named passenger trains of Europe

References

 
 
 

Named passenger trains of France
Trans Europ Express
Railway services introduced in 1968